Amlakhu, also known as Achkik and Amlaxuji) is a red Abkhazian (Georgian (country)) vine grape.

See also 
Georgian wine
List of Georgian wine appellations

References

Bibliography

Grape varieties of Georgia
Georgian wine